In constructive mathematics, a collection  is subcountable if there exists a partial surjection from the natural numbers onto it.
This may be expressed as

where  denotes that  is a surjective function from a  onto .
In other words, all elements of a subcountable collection  are functionally in the image of an indexing set of counting numbers  and thus the set  can be understood as being dominated by the countable set .

Note that nomenclature of countability and finiteness properties vary substantially, historically. The discussion here concerns the property defined in terms of surjections onto the set in question.

Discussion

Example 
An important case is where  denotes some subclass of a bigger class of functions as studied in computability theory. 

Consider the total computable functions and note that being total is not a decidable property, i.e. there cannot be a constructive bijection between the total functions and the natural numbers. However, via enumeration of the codes of all possible partial computable functions (which also allows non-terminating programs), subsets of those, such as the total functions, are seen to be subcountable sets. Note that by Rice's theorem on index sets, most domains  are not recursive. Indeed, no effective map between all counting numbers  and the infinite (non-finite) indexing set  is asserted here, merely the subset relation .

The demonstration that  is subcountable also implies that it is classically (non-constructively) formally countable, but this does not reflect any effective countability. In other words, the fact that an algorithm listing all total functions in sequence cannot be coded up is not captured by classical axioms regarding set and function existence. We see that, depending on the axioms of a theory, subcountability may be more likely to be provable than countability.

Relation to excluded middle 
In constructive logics and set theories tie the existence of a function between infinite (non-finite) sets to questions of decidability and possibly of effectivity. There, the subcountability property splits from countability and is thus not a redundant notion. 
The indexing set  of natural numbers may be posited to exist, e.g. as a subset via set theoretical axioms like the separation axiom schema.

But this set may then still fail to be detachable, in the sense that

may not be provable without assuming it as an axiom.
One may fail to effectively count the subcountable set  if one fails to map the counting numbers  into the indexing set , for this reason.
Being countable implies being subcountable. But the converse does not generally hold without asserting the law of excluded middle, i.e. that for all proposition  holds .

In classical mathematics 
Asserting all laws of classical logic, the disjunctive property of  discussed above indeed does hold for all sets. Then, for nonempty , the properties numerable (which here shall mean that  injects into ), countable ( has  as its range), subcountable (a subset of  surjects into ) and also not -productive (a countability property essentially defined in terms of subsets of ) are all equivalent and express that a set is finite or countably infinite.

Non-classical assertions 
Without the law of excluded middle, it can be consistent to assert the subcountability of sets that classically (i.e. non-constructively) exceed the cardinality of the natural numbers.
But subcountability  of an uncountable set  by a set  that is not effectively detachable from  may be permitted.

As  is uncountable and classically in turn provably not subcountable, the classical framework with its large function space is incompatible with the constructive Church's thesis, an axiom of Russian constructivism.

Subcountable and ω-productive are mutually exclusive 

As defined above, the property of being -productive associates the range  of any partial function to a particular value  not in the functions range, . In this way, a set  being -productive speaks for how hard it is to generate all the elements of it: They cannot be generated from the naturals using a single function. The -productivity property constitutes an obstruction to subcountability. As this also implies uncountability, diagonal arguments often involve this notion, explicitly since the late seventies.

For an -productive set  one finds

Read constructively, this associates any partial function  with an element  not in that functions range.
This property emphasizes the incompatibility of an -productive set  with any surjective (possibly partial) function. Below this is applied in the study of subcountability assumptions.

Set theories

Cantorian arguments on subsets of the naturals 
As reference theory we look at the constructive set theory CZF, which has Replacement, Bounded Separation, strong Infinity, is agnostic towards the existence of power sets, but includes the axiom that asserts that any function space  is set, given  are also sets. In this theory, it is moreover consistent to assert that every set is subcountable. 
The compatibility of various further axioms is discussed in this section by means of possible surjections on an infinite set of counting numbers . Here  shall denote a model of the standard natural numbers.

Recall that for functions , by definition of total functionality, there exists a unique return value for all values  in the domain, 

Constructively, fewer such existential claims will be provable than classically.

The situations discussed below—onto power classes versus onto function spaces—are different from one another: Opposed to general subclass defining predicates and their truth values (not necessarily provably just true and false), a function (which in programming terms is terminating) does makes accessible information about data for all its subdomains (subsets of the ). When as characteristic functions for their subsets, functions, through their return values, decide subset membership. So constructively, subsets are a more elaborate concept than characteristic functions.

Onto power classes
Below, the fact is used that the special case  of the negation introduction law implies that  is contradictory.

For simplicitly of the argument, assume  is a set. Then consider a subset  and a function . Further, as in Cantor's theorem about power sets, define

where,

It exists as subset via Separation. Now assuming there exists a number  with  implies the contradiction

So as a set, one finds  is -productive in that we can define an obstructing  for any given surjection. Note that the existence of a surjection  would automatically make  into a set, via Replacement in CZF, and so this function existence is unconditionally impossible.

We conclude that the subcountability axiom, asserting all sets are subcountable, is incompatible with  being a set, as implied e.g. by the power set axiom.

In classical ZFC without Powerset or any of its equivalents, it is also consistent that all subclasses of the reals which are sets are subcountable. In that context, this translates to the statement that all sets of real numbers are countable. Of course, that theory does not have the function space set .

It is also noteworthy that for any function , a similar analysis using the subset of its range  shows that  cannot be an injection. The situation is more complicated for function spaces.

Onto function spaces
By definition of function spaces, the set  holds those subsets of the set  which are provably total and functional.
Asserting the permitted subcountability of all sets turns, in particular,  into a subcountable set. 

So here we consider a surjective function  and the subset of  separated as

with the diagonalizing predicate defined as

which we can also phrase without the negations as

However, constructively, unless the proposition  in its definition is decidable so that the set actually defined a functional assignment, we cannot prove this set to be a member of the function space. And so we just cannot draw the classical conclusion.

Nevertheless, also in the case of CZF, the existence of a full surjection , with domain , is indeed contradictory. The decidable membership of  makes the set also not countable, i.e. uncountable.

The subcountibility axiom, asserting all sets are subcountable, is incompatible with any new axiom making  countable, including LEM.

Models 
Models for the non-classical extension of CZF theory by subcountability postulates have been constructed. 
Such non-constructive axioms can be seen as choice principles which, however, do not tend to increase the proof-theoretical strengths of the theories much. 
 There are models of IZF in which all sets with apartness relations are subcountable.
 CZF has a model in, for example, the Martin-Löf type theory . In this constructive set theory with classically uncountable function spaces, it is indeed consistent to assert the Subcountability Axiom, saying that every set is subcountable. As discussed, the resulting theory is in contradiction to the axiom of power set and with the law of excluded middle.
 More stronger yet, some models of Kripke–Platek set theory, a theory without the function space postulate, even validate that all sets are countable.

The notion of size 
This is what it means to be uncountable. But the argument that the cardinality of that set would thus in some sense exceed that of the natural numbers relies on a restriction to just the classical size conception and its induced ordering of sets by cardinality. Motivated by the above sections, the infinite set  may be considered "smaller" than the class . Moreover, note that constructively, an ordering "<" like that of cardinalities can be undecidable.

Related properties
Similar to subcountability (also called countably indexed), the analogous notion exists in which "" in the definition is replaced by the existence of a set that is a subset of some finite set. This property is variously called subfinitely indexed.  

In category theory these notions are subquotients.

See also
 Cantor's diagonal argument
 Computable function
 Constructive set theory
 Schröder–Bernstein theorem
 Subquotient
 Total order

References 

Constructivism (mathematics)